Illtyd M. Williams was a professional rugby league footballer who played in the 1930s. He played at club level for Castleford (Heritage № 169).

Playing career

County League appearances
Illtyd Williams played in Castleford's victory in the Yorkshire County League during the 1938–39 season.

References

External links
Search for "Williams" at rugbyleagueproject.org
Illtyd Williams Memory Box Search at archive.castigersheritage.com

Castleford Tigers players
Place of birth missing
Place of death missing
Welsh rugby league players
Year of birth missing
Year of death missing